The 2016–17 Liberian First Division League is the 43rd season of the Liberian Premier League, the Liberian professional league for association football clubs, since the league's establishment in 1956. The season started on 2 December 2016 and concluded on 9 August 2017.

Standings

References

Football competitions in Liberia
2016–17 in African association football leagues
Foo
Foo